The 2010–11 Houston Rockets season was the 44th season of the franchise in the National Basketball Association (NBA), and the 40th based in Houston. This season was Yao Ming's last in the NBA as he played only 5 games because of recurring injuries that interrupted his career. Despite his injuries, he was selected to play in the 2011 NBA All-Star Game as a starter, but he was unable to participate. Yao would then retire during the 2011 NBA lockout after playing only nine seasons in the NBA.

The Rockets ended the season with a 43–39 record without the playoffs. After the season, head coach Rick Adelman was fired after four seasons with the team.

Key dates
June 24 – The 2010 NBA draft was held in New York City.
July 1 – The free agency period begun.

Summary

NBA Draft 2010

Free agency

Draft picks

Roster

Pre-season

Game log

|- bgcolor="#ffcccc"
| 1
| October 5
| Orlando
| 
| Kevin Martin (14)
| Luis Scola (6)
| Shane Battier,Aaron Brooks,Jared Jeffries,Kyle Lowry,Courtney Lee,Ishmael Smith (2)
| State Farm Arena4,854
| 0–1
|- bgcolor="#ccffcc"
| 2
| October 7
| San Antonio
| 
| Kevin Martin (21)
| Chuck Hayes (10)
| Kyle Lowry (7)
| Toyota Center13,035
| 1–1
|- bgcolor="#ccffcc"
| 3
| October 9
| Indiana
| 
| Luis Scola (23)
| Luis Scola (11)
| Ishmael Smith (8)
| Toyota Center12,469
| 2–1
|- bgcolor="#ffcccc"
| 4
| October 10
| Cleveland
| 
| Chase Budinger (13)
| Chase Budinger (10)
| Chuck Hayes,Antonio Anderson,Ishmael Smith,Patrick Patterson (2)
| Toyota Center11,095
| 2–2
|- bgcolor="#ccffcc"
| 5
| October 13
| New Jersey
| 
| Kevin Martin (18)
| Patrick Patterson (9)
| Chase Budinger (4)
| Wukesong Arena16,996
| 3–2
|- bgcolor="#ccffcc"
| 6
| October 16
| @ New Jersey
| 
| Kevin Martin (16)
| Shane Battier,Courtney Lee (6)
| Brad Miller,Kyle Lowry (4)
| Guangzhou Gymnasium16,516
| 4–2
|- bgcolor="#ffcccc"
| 7
| October 21
| @ San Antonio
| 
| Kevin Martin (21)
| Luis Scola (7)
| Aaron Brooks (5)
| AT&T Center15,356
| 4–3
|- bgcolor="#ffcccc"
| 8
| October 22
| @ Dallas
| 
| Chase Budinger (19)
| Luis Scola,Yao Ming (8)
| Aaron Brooks,Ishmael Smith (4)
| American Airlines Center18,580
| 4–4
|-

Regular season

Standings

Record vs. opponents

Game log

|- bgcolor="#ffcccc"
| 1
| October 26
| @ L.A. Lakers
| 
| Kevin Martin (26)
| Luis Scola (16)
| Aaron Brooks (9)
| Staples Center18,997
| 0–1
|- bgcolor="#ffcccc"
| 2
| October 27					
| @ Golden State
| 
| Luis Scola (36)
| Luis Scola (16)
| Aaron Brooks (7)
| Oracle Arena18,428
| 0–2
|- bgcolor="#ffcccc"
| 3
| October 30
| Denver
| 
| Luis Scola (28)
| Luis Scola (10)
| Aaron Brooks (5)
| Toyota Center18,161
| 0–3
|-

|- bgcolor="#ffcccc"
| 4
| November 3
| New Orleans
| 
| Aaron Brooks,Kevin Martin (18)
| Luis Scola (16)
| Luis Scola (5)
| Toyota Center13,484
| 0–4
|- bgcolor="#ffcccc"
| 5
| November 6
| @ San Antonio
| 
| Kevin Martin (24)
| Chuck Hayes (13)
| Ishmael Smith (7)
| AT&T Center17,740
| 0–5
|- bgcolor="#ccffcc"
| 6
| November 7
| Minnesota
| 
| Luis Scola (24)
| Luis Scola (8)
| Ishmael Smith (6)
| Toyota Center15,058
| 1–5
|- bgcolor="#ffcccc"
| 7
| November 10
| @ Washington
| 
| Kevin Martin (31)
| Chuck Hayes,Kevin Martin (7)
| Kevin Martin (6)
| Verizon Center13,665
| 1–6
|- bgcolor="#ccffcc"
| 8
| November 12
| @ Indiana
| 
| Brad Miller (23)
| Luis Scola (9)
| Kyle Lowry (7)
| Conseco Fieldhouse14,414
| 2–6
|- bgcolor="#ccffcc"
| 9
| November 14
| @ New York
| 
| Kevin Martin (28)
| Chuck Hayes (9)
| Kyle Lowry (6)
| Madison Square Garden19,763
| 3–6
|- bgcolor="#ffcccc"
| 10
| November 16
| Chicago
| 
| Luis Scola (27)
| Chuck Hayes,Jordan Hill,Brad Miller,Luis Scola (5)
| Kyle Lowry (7)
| Toyota Center18,158
| 3–7
|- bgcolor="#ffcccc"
| 11
| November 17
| @ Oklahoma City
| 
| Luis Scola (26)
| Luis Scola (8)
| Ishmael Smith (5)
| Oklahoma City Arena17,509
| 3–8
|- bgcolor="#ffcccc"
| 12
| November 19
| @ Toronto
| 
| Kevin Martin (31)
| Kyle Lowry (7)
| Kyle Lowry (12)
| Air Canada Centre17,369
| 3–9
|- bgcolor="#ffcccc"
| 13
| November 22
| Phoenix
| 
| Kevin Martin (19)
| Jordan Hill (10)
| Kyle Lowry (8)
| Toyota Center15,080
| 3–10
|- bgcolor="#ccffcc"
| 14
| November 24
| Golden State
| 
| Kevin Martin (25)
| Luis Scola (12)
| Kyle Lowry (10)
| Toyota Center13,847
| 4–10
|- bgcolor="#ffcccc"
| 15
| November 26
| @ Charlotte
| 
| Chase Budinger (19)
| Chuck Hayes (10)
| Kyle Lowry (6)
| Time Warner Cable Arena16,473
| 4–11
|- bgcolor="#ccffcc"
| 16
| November 28
| Oklahoma City
| 
| Kevin Martin (23)
| Jordan Hill,Brad Miller (7)
| Kyle Lowry (8)
| Toyota Center15,316
| 5–11
|- bgcolor="#ffcccc"
| 17
| November 29
| @ Dallas
| 
| Kevin Martin (17)
| Jordan Hill (8)
| Kyle Lowry,Brad Miller (5)
| American Airlines Center19,435
| 5–12
|-

|- bgcolor="#ccffcc"
| 18
| December 1
| L.A. Lakers
| 
| Kevin Martin (22)
| Luis Scola (9)
| Kyle Lowry (10)
| Toyota Center18,116
| 6–12
|- bgcolor="#ccffcc"
| 19
| December 3
| @ Memphis
| 
| Kyle Lowry,Kevin Martin (28)
| Brad Miller (7)
| Kyle Lowry (12)
| FedExForum14,577
| 7–12
|- bgcolor="#ffcccc"
| 20
| December 4
| @ Chicago
| 
| Luis Scola (27)
| Luis Scola (8)
| Kyle Lowry,Kevin Martin (4)
| United Center21,232
| 7–13
|- bgcolor="#ccffcc"
| 21
| December 7
| Detroit
| 
| Luis Scola (35)
| Luis Scola (12)
| Kyle Lowry (12)
| Toyota Center14,798
| 8–13
|- bgcolor="#ffcccc"
| 22
| December 10
| @ Milwaukee
| 
| Kevin Martin (23)
| Brad Miller,Luis Scola (6)
| Brad Miller (4)
| Bradley Center14,526
| 8–14
|- bgcolor="#ccffcc"
| 23
| December 11
| Cleveland
| 
| Kevin Martin (40)
| Luis Scola (14)
| Kyle Lowry (6)
| Toyota Center15,532
| 9–14
|- bgcolor="#ccffcc"
| 24
| December 14
| Sacramento
| 
| Luis Scola (23)
| Luis Scola (10)
| Kyle Lowry (9)
| Toyota Center13,414
| 10–14
|- bgcolor="#ffcccc"
| 25
| December 15
| @ Oklahoma City
| 
| Kevin Martin (22)
| Jordan Hill,Luis Scola (5)
| Shane Battier (5)
| Oklahoma City Arena17,997
| 10–15
|- bgcolor="#ccffcc"
| 26
| December 17
| Memphis
| 
| Kevin Martin (34)
| Shane Battier (10)
| Kyle Lowry (18)
| Toyota Center14,534
| 11–15
|- bgcolor="#ccffcc"
| 27
| December 19
| @ Sacramento
| 
| Kevin Martin (22)
| Chuck Hayes (11)
| Kyle Lowry (7)
| ARCO Arena13,599
| 12–15
|- bgcolor="#ccffcc"
| 28
| December 20
| @ Golden State
| 
| Kevin Martin (30)
| Chuck Hayes (10)
| Kyle Lowry (8)
| Oracle Arena19,256
| 13–15
|- bgcolor="#ccffcc"
| 29
| December 22
| @ L.A. Clippers
| 
| Kevin Martin (28)
| Shane Battier (10)
| Shane Battier (7)
| Staples Center17,470
| 14–15
|- bgcolor="#ccffcc"
| 30
| December 27
| Washington
| 
| Kevin Martin (20)
| Chuck Hayes (8)
| Kyle Lowry (6)
| Toyota Center18,143
| 15–15
|- bgcolor="#ffcccc"
| 31
| December 29
| Miami
| 
| Luis Scola (22)
| Chuck Hayes (8)
| Aaron Brooks (8)
| Toyota Center18,409
| 15–16
|- bgcolor="#ccffcc"
| 32
| December 31
| Toronto
| 
| Chase Budinger (22)
| Patrick Patterson (10)
| Aaron Brooks (7)
| Toyota Center18,121
| 16–16
|-

|- bgcolor="#ffcccc"
| 33
| January 2
| @ Portland
| 
| Kevin Martin (15)
| Patrick Patterson (10)
| Kyle Lowry,Kevin Martin (4)
| Rose Garden20,416
| 16–17
|- bgcolor="#ffcccc"
| 34
| January 3
| @ Denver
| 
| Luis Scola (24)
| Brad Miller (11)
| Aaron Brooks,Brad Miller (5)
| Pepsi Center17,136
| 16–18
|- bgcolor="#ffcccc"
| 35
| January 5
| Portland
| 
| Kevin Martin (45)
| Luis Scola (12)
| Kyle Lowry (7)
| Toyota Center14,125
| 16–19
|- bgcolor="#ffcccc"
| 36
| January 7
| @ Orlando
| 
| Kevin Martin (27)
| Courtney Lee (6)
| Kyle Lowry (5)
| Amway Center19,107
| 16–20
|- bgcolor="#ffcccc"
| 37
| January 8
| Utah
| 
| Luis Scola (24)
| Luis Scola (10)
| Kyle Lowry (6)
| Toyota Center16,113
| 16–21
|- bgcolor="#ccffcc"
| 38
| January 10
| @ Boston
| 
| Aaron Brooks (24)
| Luis Scola (9)
| Kyle Lowry (8)
| TD Garden18,624
| 17–21
|- bgcolor="#ffcccc"
| 39
| January 12
| Oklahoma City
| 
| Luis Scola (31)
| Luis Scola (11)
| Shane Battier (6)
| Toyota Center16,158
| 17–22
|- bgcolor="#ffcccc"
| 40
| January 14
| New Orleans
| 
| Kyle Lowry (28)
| Luis Scola (11)
| Kyle Lowry (7)
| Toyota Center13,616
| 17–23
|- bgcolor="#ccffcc"
| 41
| January 15
| @ Atlanta
| 
| Aaron Brooks (24)
| Chuck Hayes,Jordan Hill (8)
| Aaron Brooks (10)
| Philips Arena13,420
| 18–23
|- bgcolor="#ccffcc"
| 42
| January 17
| Milwaukee
| 
| Kevin Martin (36)
| Luis Scola (14)
| Kyle Lowry (6)
| Toyota Center16,186
| 19–23
|- bgcolor="#ccffcc"
| 43
| January 19
| New York
| 
| Kevin Martin (21)
| Chuck Hayes (12)
| Chuck Hayes,Kyle Lowry,Kevin Martin (4)
| Toyota Center15,903
| 20–23
|- bgcolor="#ffcccc"
| 44
| January 21
| @ Memphis
| 
| Kevin Martin (32)
| Shane Battier (8)
| Kyle Lowry (8)
| FedExForum13,458
| 20–24
|- bgcolor="#ffcccc"
| 45
| January 22
| Orlando
| 
| Chase Budinger (19)
| Luis Scola (9)
| Chuck Hayes (4)
| Toyota Center18,052
| 20–25
|- bgcolor="#ccffcc"
| 46
| January 24
| @ Minnesota
| 
| Kevin Martin (34)
| Luis Scola (12)
| Chuck Hayes (7)
| Target Center11,983
| 21–25
|- bgcolor="#ccffcc"
| 47
| January 26
| L.A. Clippers
| 
| Kyle Lowry (20)
| Chuck Hayes (11)
| Kyle Lowry (8)
| Toyota Center18,147
| 22–25
|- bgcolor="#ffcccc"
| 48
| January 27
| @ Dallas
| 
| Luis Scola (30)
| Chuck Hayes,Luis Scola (8)
| Kyle Lowry (5)
| American Airlines Center20,088
| 22–26
|- bgcolor="#ffcccc"
| 49
| January 29
| @ San Antonio
| 
| Luis Scola (23)
| Luis Scola (10)
| Kyle Lowry (7)
| AT&T Center18,581
| 22–27
|-

|- bgcolor="#ffcccc"
| 50
| February 1
| @ L.A. Lakers
| 
| Kevin Martin (30)
| Luis Scola (15)
| Aaron Brooks (8)
| Staples Center18,997
| 22–28
|- bgcolor="#ccffcc"
| 51
| February 2
| @ Utah
| 
| Kevin Martin (22)
| Chuck Hayes (12)
| Kyle Lowry (5)
| EnergySolutions Arena19,619
| 23–28
|- bgcolor="#ccffcc"
| 52
| February 5
| Memphis
| 
| Kevin Martin (31)
| Shane Battier (13)
| Kyle Lowry (6)
| Toyota Center18,195
| 24–28
|- bgcolor="#ccffcc"
| 53
| February 7
| @ Denver
| 
| Kevin Martin (37)
| Chuck Hayes (10)
| Kevin Martin (7)
| Pepsi Center14,595
| 25–28
|- bgcolor="#ffcccc"
| 54
| February 8
| Minnesota
| 
| Courtney Lee,Kevin Martin (23)
| Chuck Hayes (13)
| Luis Scola (7)
| Toyota Center15,679
| 25–29
|- bgcolor="#ffcccc"
| 55
| February 12
| Dallas
| 
| Kyle Lowry (26)
| Jordan Hill (9)
| Kyle Lowry (8)
| Toyota Center17,009
| 25–30
|- bgcolor="#ccffcc"
| 56
| February 14
| Denver
| 
| Courtney Lee (22)
| Luis Scola (8)
| Kyle Lowry (7)
| Toyota Center16,450
| 26–30
|- bgcolor="#ffcccc"
| 57
| February 16
| Philadelphia
| 
| Kyle Lowry (36)
| Luis Scola (13)
| Kyle Lowry (7)
| Toyota Center14,476
| 26–31
|- align="center"
|colspan="9" bgcolor="#bbcaff"|All-Star Break 
|- bgcolor="#ccffcc"
| 58
| February 22
| @ Detroit
| 
| Patrick Patterson (20)
| Luis Scola (9)
| Aaron Brooks (6)
| The Palace of Auburn Hills12,353
| 27–31
|- bgcolor="#ccffcc"
| 59
| February 23
| @ Cleveland
| 
| Chase Budinger,Kevin Martin (30)
| Chuck Hayes (17)
| Brad Miller (5)
| Quicken Loans Arena18,027
| 28–31
|- bgcolor="#ccffcc"
| 60
| February 26
| New Jersey
| 
| Kevin Martin (30)
| Chuck Hayes (11)
| Kyle Lowry (9)
| Toyota Center17,209
| 29–31
|- bgcolor="#ccffcc"
| 61
| February 27
| @ New Orleans
| 
| Kevin Martin (33)
| Chuck Hayes (11)
| Chuck Hayes (5)
| New Orleans Arena17,466
| 30–31
|-

|- bgcolor="#ccffcc"
| 62
| March 1
| @ Portland
| 
| Kyle Lowry,Luis Scola (21)
| Chuck Hayes (7)
| Kyle Lowry (11)
| Rose Garden20,272
| 31–31
|- bgcolor="#ffcccc"
| 63
| March 2
| @ L.A. Clippers
| 
| Kyle Lowry (24)
| Chuck Hayes (12)
| Kyle Lowry (11)
| Staples Center19,060
| 31–32
|- bgcolor="#ccffcc"
| 64
| March 5
| Indiana
| 
| Kevin Martin (20)
| Chuck Hayes (10)
| Kyle Lowry (6)
| Toyota Center14,965
| 32–32
|- bgcolor="#ccffcc"
| 65
| March 7
| @ Sacramento
| 
| Chase Budinger (20)
| Kyle Lowry (7)
| Kyle Lowry (8)
| Power Balance Pavilion12,561
| 33–32
|- bgcolor="#ffcccc"
| 66
| March 8
| @ Phoenix
| 
| Kyle Lowry (32)
| Chuck Hayes,Brad Miller (9)
| Kyle Lowry,Kevin Martin,Brad Miller (4)
| US Airways Center17,363
| 33–33
|- bgcolor="#ffcccc"
| 67
| March 12
| San Antonio
| 
| Kevin Martin (28)
| Chuck Hayes (11)
| Kyle Lowry (9)
| Toyota Center18,245
| 33–34
|- bgcolor="#ccffcc"
| 68
| March 14
| Phoenix
| 
| Kevin Martin (23)
| Chuck Hayes (9)
| Kyle Lowry (5)
| Toyota Center16,262
| 34–34
|- bgcolor="#ccffcc"
| 69
| March 16
| Charlotte
| 
| Kevin Martin (21)
| Chuck Hayes (17)
| Chuck Hayes (7)
| Toyota Center14,822
| 35–34
|- bgcolor="#ccffcc"
| 70
| March 18
| Boston
| 
| Kevin Martin (25)
| Patrick Patterson (12)
| Kyle Lowry (9)
| Toyota Center18,412
| 36–34
|- bgcolor="#ccffcc"
| 71
| March 20
| Utah
| 
| Kevin Martin (34)
| Patrick Patterson (13)
| Kyle Lowry (10)
| Toyota Center14,459
| 37–34
|- bgcolor="#ccffcc"
| 72
| March 23
| Golden State
| 
| Kevin Martin (34)
| Chuck Hayes (14)
| Kyle Lowry (12)
| Toyota Center16,623
| 38–34
|- bgcolor="#ffcccc"
| 73
| March 27
| @ Miami
| 
| Kevin Martin (29)
| Chuck Hayes,Kyle Lowry (7)
| Kyle Lowry (9)
| American Airlines Arena19,825
| 38–35
|- bgcolor="#ccffcc"
| 74
| March 29
| @ New Jersey
| 
| Kevin Martin (20)
| Chuck Hayes (14)
| Kyle Lowry (10)
| Prudential Center13,866
| 39–35
|- bgcolor="#ffcccc"
| 75
| March 30
| @ Philadelphia
| 
| Kyle Lowry (19)
| Chase Budinger (9)
| Chuck Hayes (7)
| Wells Fargo Center16,635
| 39–36
|-

|- bgcolor="#ccffcc"
| 76
| April 1
| San Antonio
| 
| Kevin Martin (33)
| Luis Scola (14)
| Luis Scola (6)
| Toyota Center18,059
| 40–36
|- bgcolor="#ccffcc"
| 77
| April 3
| Atlanta
| 
| Kevin Martin (35)
| Chuck Hayes (12)
| Kyle Lowry (8)
| Toyota Center15,993
| 41–36
|- bgcolor="#ffcccc"
| 78
| April 5
| Sacramento
| 
| Kevin Martin (30)
| Chuck Hayes,Luis Scola (10)
| Kyle Lowry (9)
| Toyota Center15,523
| 41–37
|- bgcolor="#ffcccc"
| 79
| April 6
| @ New Orleans
| 
| Kevin Martin (21)
| Chuck Hayes,Luis Scola (10)
| Courtney Lee,Kyle Lowry (6)
| New Orleans Arena12,728
| 41–38
|- bgcolor="#ccffcc"
| 80
| April 9
| L.A. Clippers
| 
| Chase Budinger,Kevin Martin,Brad Miller (16)
| Chuck Hayes (13)
| Goran Dragić (7)
| Toyota Center18,089
| 42–38
|- bgcolor="#ffcccc"
| 81
| April 11
| Dallas
| 
| Kevin Martin (28)
| Chuck Hayes (12)
| Goran Dragić (7)
| Toyota Center14,898
| 42–39
|- bgcolor="#ccffcc"
| 82
| April 13
| @ Minnesota
| 
| Chase Budinger (35)
| Goran Dragić (11)
| Goran Dragić (11)
| Target Center17,101
| 43–39
|-

Playoffs

Game log

Player statistics

Season

|- align="center" bgcolor=""
| * || 59 || 59 || 30.8 || .456 || .391 || .645 || 4.8 || 2.6 || .90 || 1.20 || 8.6
|- align="center" bgcolor="#f0f0f0"
| * || 34 || 7 || 23.9 || .346 || .284 || style="background:silver;color:#C5001E;"| .940 || 1.5 || 3.8 || .60 || .10 || 11.6
|- align="center" bgcolor=""
|  || 71 || 15 || 21.3 || .421 || .335 || .852 || 3.5 || 1.5 || .54 || .21 || 9.4
|- align="center" bgcolor="#f0f0f0"
| * || 4 || 0 || 2.0 || .000 || .0 || .0 || 0.0 || 0.5 || .0 || .0 || 0.0
|- align="center" bgcolor=""
| * || 15 || 0 || 13.2 || .486 || style="background:silver;color:#C5001E;"| .552 || .724 || 1.5 || 1.8 || .60 || .07 || 7.1
|- align="center" bgcolor="#f0f0f0"
|  || 3 || 0 || 2.0 || style="background:silver;color:#C5001E;"| .667 || .0 || .0 || 0.0 || 0.0 || .0 || .0 || 1.3
|- align="center" bgcolor=""
|  || 67 || 56 || 27.2 || .527 || .000 || .664 || 7.8 || 2.6 || 1.00 || .67 || 7.7
|- align="center" bgcolor="#f0f0f0"
|  || 67 || 11 || 16.2 || .490 || .000 || .720 || 4.4 || 0.4 || .21 || .73 || 5.8
|- align="center" bgcolor=""
| * || 18 || 0 || 7.7 || .306 || .167 || .400 || 1.9 || 0.6 || .40 || .20 || 1.5
|- align="center" bgcolor="#f0f0f0"
|  || style="background:silver;color:#C5001E;"| 74 || 1 || 20.6 || .452 || .426 || .755 || 2.4 || 1.1 || .70 || .20 || 8.1
|- align="center" bgcolor=""
|  || 71 || 67 || style="background:silver;color:#C5001E;"| 33.8 || .433 || .380 || .755 || 4.1 || style="background:silver;color:#C5001E;"| 6.6 || style="background:silver;color:#C5001E;"| 1.39 || .31 || 13.5
|- align="center" bgcolor="#f0f0f0"
|  || 73 || style="background:silver;color:#C5001E;"| 73 || 31.9 || .436 || .390 || .893 || 3.2 || 2.4 || 1.04 || .19 || style="background:silver;color:#C5001E;"| 23.1
|- align="center" bgcolor=""
|  || 56 || 5 || 16.5 || .438 || .358 || .822 || 3.5 || 2.3 || .45 || .36 || 6.1
|- align="center" bgcolor="#f0f0f0"
|  || 45 || 3 || 15.9 || .557 || .000 || .727 || 3.9 || 0.8 || .33 || .71 || 6.0
|- align="center" bgcolor=""
|  || 70 || 70 || 32.5 || .501 || .000 || .736 || style="background:silver;color:#C5001E;"| 8.1 || 2.4 || .63 || .63 || 18.3
|- align="center" bgcolor="#f0f0f0"
| * || 28 || 3 || 11.8 || .386 || .375 || .700 || 1.5 || 2.3 || .50 || .10 || 2.6
|- align="center" bgcolor=""
| * || 8 || 0 || 9.6 || .500 || .400 || .833 || 1.1 || 0.3 || .30 || .30 || 4.9
|- align="center" bgcolor="#f0f0f0"
| * || 2 || 0 || 2.0 || .000 || .0 || .0 || 0.0 || 0.0 || .0 || .50 || 0.0
|- align="center" bgcolor=""
| * || 11 || 0 || 7.6 || .333 || .200 || .818 || 1.4 || 0.6 || .36 || .0 || 3.5
|- align="center" bgcolor="#f0f0f0"
|  || 5 || 5 || 18.2 || .486 || .273 || .938 || 5.4 || 0.8 || .0 || style="background:silver;color:#C5001E;"| 1.60 || 10.2
|}

As of March 31.
* – Stats with the Rockets.

Playoffs

Awards, records and milestones

Awards

Week/Month
Kevin Martin was named Western Conference Player of the Week for games played February 21 through February 27.
Kyle Lowry was named Western Conference Player of the Week for games played March 14 through March 20.

All-Star
Yao Ming was selected by fans as the starting center for the 2011 NBA All-Star Game. He was unable to play due to injury. Kevin Love of the Minnesota Timberwolves was selected as his replacement, and Tim Duncan of the San Antonio Spurs was selected to start in his place.

Season

Records

Milestones

Injuries and surgeries

Transactions

Trades

Free agents

Additions

Subtractions

References

Houston Rockets seasons
Houston